Montana Highway 69 (MT 69) is a route running northerly from an intersection with MT 55 in the community of Whitehall. Most of the route follows the Boulder River valley, a scenic and relatively unspoiled rural landscape.

Route description
MT 69 begins at MT 55 at Whitehall. Concurrent with MT 2, it runs parallel to I-90, before intersecting it, and proceeding northward. An intersection with Boulder Cutoff Road is not far off. It reaches an intersection with Wilson Park Road before continuing northward, and intersecting Dunn Canyon Road. Dunn lane intersects from the east, and shortly after, MT 69 intersects with Lower Valley Road. Thereafter, it intersects Quintana Lane before intersecting several minor roads. Through a scenic and rural area, MT 69 proceeds north as South Main Street as it enters Boulder. MT 69 ends at I-15, at Boulder.

History
The southerly six miles of the current MT 69 follows a former alignment of U.S. Route 10 and parallels Interstate 90; the U.S. 10 designation was deleted in Montana after the completion of the interstate.  The remainder of MT 69 was formerly designated as Secondary Highway 281.

Major intersections

References

External links

069
Transportation in Jefferson County, Montana
U.S. Route 10